Josenid (born Josenid Adamaris Quintero Gallardo on 3 December 1998 in Chiriquí, Panama) is a child-genre singer from Panama. Josenid started singing when she was 9 year old, while she was participating in a contest called Canta Conmigo in Panama. Josenid placed 3rd. After the festival Josenid collaborated with Makano and she recorded the song "Su Nombre en mi Cuaderno" (His Name in My Notebook), and her first single "Amor de colegio" (grade school Love) in 2010. Josenid after her song I love college 4 more songs and Josen said to be ready to create some more songs.

Discography

References

1998 births
Living people
21st-century Panamanian women singers
21st-century Panamanian singers
Child singers
People from Chiriquí Province